The 1996–97 Irish Cup was the 117th edition of Northern Ireland's premier football knock-out cup competition. It concluded on 3 May 1997 with the final.

Glentoran were the defending champions after winning their 16th Irish Cup last season, with a 1–0 win over Glenavon in the 1996 final. This season Glenavon went one better by winning the cup for the 5th time, with a 1–0 win over Cliftonville in the final.

Fifth round

|}

Replays

|}

Sixth round

|}

Replay

|}

Quarter-finals

|}

Replays

|}

Semi-finals

|}

Final

References

1996–97
1996–97 domestic association football cups
1996–97 in Northern Ireland association football